ClO2 may refer to:

Chlorine dioxide, an explosive gas
Chlorite, a chlorine oxyanion
Chloryl, a rare example of an oxycation